Austropyrgus grampianensis is a species of minute freshwater snail with an operculum, an aquatic gastropod mollusk or micromollusk in the Hydrobiidae family. This species is endemic to western Victoria, Australia. It is known from two small creeks in the Grampians.

See also 
 List of non-marine molluscs of Australia

References

Further reading

External links

Hydrobiidae
Austropyrgus
Gastropods of Australia
Endemic fauna of Australia
Gastropods described in 1939
Taxonomy articles created by Polbot